Hind Khel Wazir or Hindi Khel is a town and union council of Bannu District in Khyber Pakhtunkhwa province of Pakistan. It is located at 32°47'38N 70°30'29E and has an altitude of 327 metres (1076 feet).

References

Union councils of Bannu District
Populated places in Bannu District